P. sinense may refer to:
 Primulidium sinense, a synonym for Primula sinensis, a plant species found in China
 Psilopeganum sinense, a flowering plant species

See also